Kayla Marie Sims (born August 14, 1999), also known by her YouTube handle lilsimsie, is an American YouTuber and Twitch streamer. Sims is best known for playing The Sims 4 and collaborations with EA on projects such as The Sims 4: Snowy Escape and EA Game Changers.

Career

YouTube 
Sims started making YouTube videos about The Sims in 2015. Sims' most popular YouTube video, "I left The Sims unpaused all night by accident and THIS is what happened..." has over 1.2 million views. As of May 2021, Sims has over a million subscribers.

Sims is the creator of the Wolf Pack Challenge, which uses The Sims 4: Cats & Dogs expansion pack, and the Not So Berry Challenge, created with her friend Zoë (alwaysimming). In 2019, for her "Simsie Save", in which Sims renovates the game's worlds and characters, Sims made all toilets in her save gender-neutral. One of Sims' longest running YouTube series was the "100 Baby Challenge" series, in which she completed the 100 Baby Challenge in The Sims 4 over the course of five years. 

In a July 2020 patch to The Sims 4, all cowplants in the game were given the default name "Little Simzee" as a nod to Sims' campaign for the ability to name cowplants in game. Part of this campaign included getting the #justiceforcowplants trending on the Sims gallery via a "shell" building challenge. In August 2020, Sims joined other Sims YouTubers in speaking out against the lack of diversity in skin tones in The Sims 4.

Sims is a judge on YouTube's gaming creator competition show, uTure.

Twitch 
Sims has a Twitch channel with over 722,000 followers, and streams six days per week. In 2018, Sims was nominated for Streamer of the Year at Summer in the City for her streaming on Twitch. In January 2021, an illustration of her cat was made the PogChamp emote on Twitch for a day.

In May 2021, Sims took part in a charity fundraiser for St. Jude Play Live 2021 and raised over $300,000 for the children's hospital. In June 2021, Sims raised $15,000 for the Transgender Law Center during a charity stream. In August of 2021, Sims raised over $100,000 for AbleGamers to help Steven Spohn reach his birthday fundraising goal of $1,000,000.   In May of 2022, Sims raised $366,535 for St. Jude Children's Research Hospital. 

Sims, as part of the team Sandy's Candies with streamers brandiganBTW, Fuzzireno, and TheHaboo, won the first Stardew Valley Cup in September 2021. 

In May 2022, Sims revisited the subject of her most popular video, leaving her Sims 4 game unpaused all night, but this time on her Twitch stream instead of in a YouTube video.

Other 
In October 2020, Sims announced her collaboration with The Sims 4: Snowy Escape expansion pack, creating three lots for the game: 6-4-1 Hanamigawa, 5-6-1 Shinrinyoku, and 2-5-1 Wakabamori.

Sims also creates content for TikTok. In January 2022, a TikTok she made explaining first-person mode in the Sims 4 and featuring a sim making a grilled cheese was removed for "nudity and sexual activity." The TikTok was subsequently restored and has over 500,000 views.

Education 

Sims attended the University of Central Florida. She originally majored in digital media, but switched her major to history in 2018. In May of 2020, Sims graduated college with an undergraduate degree in history.

Personal life 
Sims began playing The Sims when she was 12 and became particularly interested in the game after her father was diagnosed with cancer when she was 14. Sims has attributed the game with helping her cope with her father's diagnosis, using it as an “escape”.

Sims has a younger brother and sister, Brett and Shanna. 

Sims married fellow streamer Dan Grenander on August 25, 2021. Previously, Grenander had moved to the United States to live with her in July 2021 on a K1 Fiance Visa, after living in the United Kingdom. They applied for a K1 Visa in February 2020. Grenander streams on Twitch under the name “duckdan” and uploads to his associated YouTube channel under the same name. Grenander often plays games such as Dead by Daylight, Fall Guys and Minecraft. They often play games together, such as Mario Kart, Among Us and Fall Guys. They live in Oviedo, Florida.

References 

1999 births
American YouTubers
Living people
Twitch (service) streamers
21st-century American women
Gaming YouTubers
YouTube channels launched in 2015
People from Chicago
University of Central Florida alumni